Alfred-Auguste Giraudet (28 March 1845, Seine-et-Oise - 18 October 1911, New York City) was a French operatic bass, voice teacher, and writer on singing. He was one of the earliest exponents of the role of Méphistophélès in Charles Gounod's  Faust; a role he portrayed many times at the Paris Opera where he was a principal artist for over two decades. He was also a regular performer at the Opéra-Comique and taught singing at the Conservatoire de Paris for 15 years. On 10 May 1869 he portrayed the title role in the world premiere of Ernest Boulanger's Don Quichotte at the Théâtre Lyrique. In 1876 he created the role of Vulcan in the world premiere of the revised version of Gounod's Philémon et Baucis. In the Fall of 1908 he joined the voice faculty of the Institute of Musical Art (now the Juilliard School) where he taught for two school years. He died suddenly of pulmonary edema at his home on Claremont Avenue in Manhattan on 18 October 1911, shortly after beginning his third year of teaching in New York.

As a singing teacher and writer on singing, Giraudet was greatly influenced by François Delsarte and his theory of voice gymnastics which was an important precursor to the development of modern dance. Giraudet had studied singing with Delsarte at the Conservatoire de Paris and was one of his most distinguished students. His notable pupils included Mariska Aldrich, Lucia Dunham, Charles Rousselière, and Félix Vieuille.

References

Cited sources
 Walsh, T. J. (1981). Second Empire Opera: The Théâtre Lyrique Paris 1851–1870. New York: Riverrun Press. .

External links
Alfred Giraudet at the Bibliothèque nationale de France

1845 births
1911 deaths
Academic staff of the Conservatoire de Paris
Conservatoire de Paris alumni
19th-century French male opera singers
Juilliard School faculty